Thomas Earle (September 27, 1837 – July 13, 1911) was a Canadian businessman and Conservative politician who represented Victoria (electoral district) in the House of Commons of Canada from 1889 to 1904.

Born in Landsdowne Township, Upper Canada, the son of William Earle, he was educated there and became a merchant in Brockville. Earle moved to the Cariboo district of British Columbia in 1863, establishing a grocery business in Victoria in 1873. He was also involved in railway construction in British Columbia, Oregon and Washington state. In 1875, he married Elizabeth Mason. Earle was acclaimed during a by-election following Edgar Crow Baker's resignation. He also served on Victoria City Council in 1885. Earle died in Victoria at the age of 73.

References

Members of the House of Commons of Canada from British Columbia
Conservative Party of Canada (1867–1942) MPs
1837 births
1911 deaths
Victoria, British Columbia city councillors